The 2019–20 Macedonian First League is the 28th season of the Macedonian First League, with 10 teams participating in it. MZT Skopje Aerodrom are the defending champions.

On 12 March 2020, the competition was postponed due to the coronavirus pandemic in North Macedonia.

Competition format 
Ten teams that compose the league will play a double-legged round robin tournament.

Teams  

The second team of MZT Skopje (MZT Skopje Uni Banka) and Akademija FMP were promoted. Two clubs from Gevgelia, Blokotehna and Kožuv, merged into one club, while Shkupi was relegated. On September 30, AV Ohrid was dissolved, so the beginning of this season was delayed to October, 12.

Regular season

League table

Results

References

External links
 Macedonian First League website
 Macedonian First League at Eurobasket.com

Macedonian First League (basketball) seasons
Macedonian
Basketball
North Macedonia